Chloé Isaac (born June 5, 1991) is a French-born Canadian synchronized swimmer who competed at the London 2012 Olympics and 2013 World Aquatics Championships.

Chloé won a bronze medal in the combo event at the 2009 and 2011 FINA World Aquatics Championships. In 2010, she won a gold medal in the women's duet at the Commonwealth Games in Delhi with Marie-Pier Boudreau Gagnon.

References

External links 
 

Canadian synchronized swimmers
Olympic synchronized swimmers of Canada
Synchronized swimmers at the 2012 Summer Olympics
1991 births
Living people
People from Brossard
People from Montivilliers
World Aquatics Championships medalists in synchronised swimming
Synchronised swimmers at the 2010 Commonwealth Games
Synchronized swimmers at the 2011 World Aquatics Championships
Synchronized swimmers at the 2013 World Aquatics Championships
Synchronized swimmers at the 2009 World Aquatics Championships
Synchronized swimmers at the 2011 Pan American Games
Commonwealth Games gold medallists for Canada
Commonwealth Games medallists in synchronised swimming
Pan American Games medalists in synchronized swimming
Pan American Games gold medalists for Canada
Medalists at the 2011 Pan American Games
Sportspeople from Seine-Maritime
Medallists at the 2010 Commonwealth Games